The Men's 100 meter Race at the IPC Athletics Asia-Oceania Championship 2016 was held at the Dubai Police Club Stadium in Dubai from 7–12 March.

Results
Legend

AS: Asian Record

WR: World Record

PB: Personal Best

SB: Season Best

T20 Final
 Date- 07:March:2016
Time- 16:45

References 

IPC Athletics Asia-Oceania Championship 2016